Descendants of the Sun is a 2020 Philippine television drama action series broadcast by GMA Network. The series is based on a 2016 South Korean television drama series of the same title. It premiered on the network's Telebabad line up and worldwide via GMA Pinoy TV from February 10, 2020 to December 25, 2020, replacing The Gift and was replaced by the returning Love of My Life.

Series overview

Episodes

References

Lists of Philippine drama television series episodes